Tom Marsh may refer to:
Tom Marsh (baseball) (born 1965), Major League Baseball player
Tom Marsh (politician) (born 1939), member of the Oregon House of Representatives
Tom Marsh, member of the UK band Trash Fashion

See also
 Thomas B. Marsh (1800–1866), early leader in the Latter Day Saint movement